Mulpani Cricket Stadium is a cricket stadium in Mulpani, Kathmandu, Nepal.
The upper ground has already hosted several national level tournaments whereas lower ground is under construction.

Construction 
Cricket Association of Nepal had initiated to construct two grounds in Mulpani after the Asian Cricket Council's plan to build its central cricket academy in the current Mulpani venue didn't materialise.

In 2011, the stadium received रु 30 million for its construction from Ministry of Youth and Sports as well as CAN signed a contract with Gaura Construction Pvt. Ltd.

In 2013, National Sports Council allocated around रु 45 million from the sports budget for a second cricket ground in Mulpani.

In 2014, the stadium  is allocated a separate रु 200 million for its construction in the 2014/15 budget presented by the Finance Minister.

In 2019, the construction work of the Mulpani Cricket Stadium will gain momentum as the land dispute has been resolved.National Sports Council has demanded रु 400 million from the government for the completion of the stadium.After completion, the 13,000-people capacity stadium will have an administrative block, swimming pool, academia and its practice ground, hostel and other facilities.

In 2022, construction of stadium has started after almost 5 years of time gap.

References

Cricket grounds in Nepal
Sports venues in Kathmandu